Cobelura lorigera is a species of longhorn beetle of the subfamily Lamiinae. It was described by Wilhelm Ferdinand Erichson in 1847, and is known from Peru.

References

Beetles described in 1847
Acanthocinini